Frederick Christian Struckmeyer Jr. (January 4, 1912 – June 22, 1992) was a justice of the Supreme Court of Arizona from January 3, 1955, to January 19, 1982. He served as chief justice of the court on four occasions.

Biography
Struckmeyer  was the eldest son of Justice Frederick Christian "F.C." Struckmeyer, Sr., who served one term on the Superior Court in Maricopa County from 1923 to 1925, then as code commissioner. Struckmeyer received a bachelor's degree and then a law degree in 1936 from  University of Arizona. He went to work as a deputy Maricopa County attorney before serving in the United States Army during World War II where he was awarded the Silver Star Bronze Star Medal and a Purple Heart.

He became a Superior Court judge in 1950. Five years later he was elected to the Arizona Supreme Court, where he served for 26 years.
At 43, he was the youngest person ever elected or appointed to the Supreme Court. After his mandatory retirement at the age of 70 he was appointed to the Arizona Racing Commission.

On February 9, 1953, Judge Struckmeyer decided the case Phillips vs. Phoenix Union High Schools and Junior College District, a case over Carver High School, the only legally segregated high school  in the state. In the case, Struckmeyer ruled that the Arizona law permitting school boards to segregate pupils was unconstitutional, and the Phoenix Union High School District segregation of African-American students was illegal. His decision was made a year before the Supreme Court of the United States decided Brown v. Board of Education.

In 1988, he rejoined the high court for Green v. Osborne, a 4–1 decision that canceled a recall election for Evan Mecham because Mecham already had been impeached and removed as governor.

Judge Struckmeyer died in 1992 and was buried at the National Memorial Cemetery of Arizona in Phoenix.

See also
 List of justices of the Arizona Supreme Court

References

Related reading
 Zarbin, Earl A (1991)  The bench and the bar: A history of Maricopa County's legal profession   (Windsor Publications) 
 Photo
 1953 Photo, Arizona Sun
 1954 Campaign Photo, El Sol

1912 births
1992 deaths
Justices of the Arizona Supreme Court
University of Arizona alumni
James E. Rogers College of Law alumni
Chief Justices of the Arizona Supreme Court
20th-century American judges